Geshi (also Romanized as Geshī and Gashī; also known as Gīshī) is a village in Abdan Rural District, in the Central District of Deyr County, Bushehr Province, Iran. At the 2006 census, its population was 175, in 26 families.

References 

Populated places in Deyr County